Krzysztof Baran may refer to:

 Krzysztof Baran (footballer, born 1960), Polish footballer
 Krzysztof Baran (footballer, born 1990), Polish footballer